Jonathan Adair Turner, Baron Turner of Ecchinswell (born 5 October 1955) is a British businessman and academic and was Chairman of the Financial Services Authority until its abolition in March 2013. He is a former Chairman of the Pensions Commission and the Committee on Climate Change, as well as a former Director-General of the Confederation of British Industry. He has described himself in a BBC HARDtalk interview with Stephen Sackur as a 'technocrat'. 

He is a vocal advocate of monetary financing and "helicopter money" whereby central banks would directly finance government spending or cash distribution to citizens. Since 2010, he has written monthly opinion columns on economic and regulatory policy for Project Syndicate.

Early life
Adair Turner was born in Ipswich. He grew up in Crawley and East Kilbride (both new towns. His father Geoffrey was a University of Liverpool-educated town planner). Adair attended Hutchesons' Grammar School in Glasgow, then moved to Glenalmond College. He studied at Gonville and Caius College, Cambridge, where he took a Double first in History and Economics and became President of the Cambridge Union. He was also Chairman of the University's Conservative Association. He joined the Social Democratic Party (SDP) in 1981.

Business career

He taught economics part-time after university.  His career with BP started in 1979 and he worked for Chase Manhattan Bank from 1979 to 1982.  He became a director of McKinsey & Co in 1994 after joining in 1982. Turner was Director-General of the Confederation of British Industry (CBI) from 1995 to 1999. In this role he became one of the leading proponents of British membership of the euro – a stance he later said was mistaken. From 2000 to 2006 he was Vice-Chairman of Merrill Lynch Europe.

He lectures part-time at the London School of Economics, where in 2010 he delivered three lectures on "Economics after the Crisis", later published by MIT Press as a book under that title: this criticised conventional wisdom that the object of policy should be to maximise GDP, that the way to do this is to promote freer markets, and that inequality is an acceptable price for growth.

In 2002, he chaired a UK government enquiry into pensions. In 2007, he succeeded Frances Cairncross as Chairman of the Economic and Social Research Council and Baroness Jay as Chair of the Overseas Development Institute's Council.

In 2008 his Building a Low-carbon Economy (co-written with David Kennedy) was published, and the same year Turner was appointed as first Chairman of the British Government's newly established Committee on Climate Change. He stepped down from this position in Spring 2012.

On 29 May 2008, it was announced that he would take over as Chairman of the Financial Services Authority. He took up this post on 20 September 2008 for a five-year term to succeed Callum McCarthy.

Financial Services Authority
Turner defended the actions of the regulator on the BBC's Andrew Marr show on 15 February 2009, saying that other regulatory bodies throughout the world, which varied in structure and lightness of regulatory touch, also failed to predict the economic collapse. He said that in line with other regulators the FSA had failed intellectually by focusing too much on processes and procedures rather than looking at the bigger economic picture. Asked why Sir James Crosby had been appointed deputy chairman when the FSA had said that his bank HBOS was using risky lending practices, Lord Turner said that they had files on almost every financial institution indicating a degree of risk.

He did not apologise for the actions of the FSA, which had presided over the near-total collapse of several major banks, and accepted that it had not foreseen the consequences for Lloyds Bank of its merger with the ailing HBOS in September 2008. Despite controversy over bonuses for employees of Lloyds, he sought to justify bonuses averaging 15 per cent for his own 2,500 staff, arguing "If you're saying we should now cut the bonuses [of FSA employees], you're saying you should cut their pay by 15%".

In August 2009 in an interview for Prospect magazine he supported the idea of new global taxes on financial transactions (the  "Tobin tax"), warning that a "swollen" financial sector paying excessive salaries had grown too big for society.

Institute for New Economic Thinking
In April 2013, it was announced that Lord Turner would be joining George Soros' economic think tank, the Institute for New Economic Thinking, as a senior research fellow in its London offices. From that, he wrote a book "Between Debt and the Devil: Money, Credit, and Fixing Global Finance" Princeton University Press, 2016

Global Apollo Programme
In 2015, he was co-author of the report that launched the Global Apollo Programme, which calls for developed nations to commit to spending 0.02% of their GDP for 10 years, to fund co-ordinated research to make carbon-free baseload electricity less costly than electricity from coal by the year 2025.

Honoured
On 7 September 2005 he was created a life peer as Baron Turner of Ecchinswell, of Ecchinswell in the County of Hampshire, awarded in recognition of his public service to the nation (he has a cottage in Ecchinswell). He sits as a crossbencher.

In 2016 he was elected an Honorary Fellow of the Royal Society.

Personal life
In 1985 he married Orna Ní Chionna, whom he met at McKinsey. She comes from Ireland, and was born c. 1956.  She was Chair of the council of the Soil Association and a non-executive director of Northern Foods. Orna is a non-executive director of Royal Mail plc.

References

External links

 FSA – Official Biography
 Biography of Adair Turner at the former Pensions Commission
 Announcement of his introduction at the House of Lords House of Lords minutes of proceedings, 12 October 2005
 Times profile 4 December 2005
 Times article 25 November 2005
 Guardian profile 25 November 2005
 Adair Turner Biography
 Lord Turner to join Soros-funded think tank (BBC News | Business)
 BBC Radio 4 Profile

1955 births
Living people
People from Crawley
Businesspeople from Ipswich
People educated at Glenalmond College
People educated at Hutchesons' Grammar School
Alumni of Gonville and Caius College, Cambridge
British business writers
McKinsey & Company people
Turner of Ecchinswell
Crossbench life peers
Presidents of the Cambridge Union
Social Democratic Party (UK) politicians
Global Apollo Programme
Honorary Fellows of the Royal Society
Institute for New Economic Thinking
Life peers created by Elizabeth II